Bruce Douglas Black (born July 27, 1947) is an American attorney and jurist who served as a United States district judge of the United States District Court for the District of New Mexico from 1995 to 2017.

Early life and education

Born in Detroit, Michigan, Black received a Bachelor of Arts degree from Albion College in 1969 and a Juris Doctor from the University of Michigan Law School in 1971.

Career 
He was in private practice in New Mexico from 1972 to 1991. He was a judge on the New Mexico Court of Appeals from 1991 to 1995.

On August 10, 1995, Black was nominated by President Bill Clinton to a seat on the United States District Court for the District of New Mexico vacated by Juan Guerrero Burciaga. Black was confirmed by the United States Senate on December 22, 1995, and received his commission on December 26, 1995. He served as chief judge from 2010 to 2012. He assumed senior status on October 1, 2012. He retired from active service on January 1, 2017.

References

External links
  

1947 births
Living people
20th-century American judges
21st-century American judges
Albion College alumni
Judges of the United States District Court for the District of New Mexico
New Mexico state court judges
Lawyers from Detroit
United States district court judges appointed by Bill Clinton
University of Michigan Law School alumni